The House of Special Purpose is a novel written by Irish-Canadian novelist John Boyne. It was first published in 2009 by Doubleday and re-published by Other Press in 2013.

References 

2009 Irish novels
Novels by John Boyne
Doubleday (publisher) books